The Elephant Canyon Formation is the basal Permian geologic formation of the Cutler Group overlying an unconformity on the Pennsylvanian Honaker Trail Formation in the Paradox Basin of southern Utah.

Description

It consists of pink dolomite, light-gray dolomitic sandstone, light-brown and moderate-red, fine-grained sandstone, a basal conglomerate and conglomeratic sandstone, and limestone. The basal conglomerate is composed of moderately sorted cherts up to 3 cm in diameter. It weathers to a medium brown and forms hackly, blocky ledges and intervening slopes.

See also

 List of fossiliferous stratigraphic units in Utah
 Paleontology in Utah

References

 

Geologic formations of Utah
Permian geology of Utah
Permian System of North America
Cutler Formation